Rieux-en-Val is a commune in the Aude department in southern France. It is located approximately halfway between Carcasonne and Perpignan.

Population

See also
Corbières AOC
Communes of the Aude department

References

Communes of Aude